Glaphyra was an Anatolian princess who lived from around 35 BCE to 7 CE.

Glaphyra may also refer to:

Glaphyra, a junior synonym of the beetle genus Molorchus
Glaphyra (given name), including a list of people with the given name Glaphyra or Glafira
Glaphyra (hetaera), mistress of Mark Antony
, a ship launched in India in 1814 that was wrecked in 1854 after a career as a West Indiaman

See also
, including species names ending in "glaphyra"
Glaphyria, a genus of moths